Kicked In the Teeth is a 1998 album by the American band Zeke, released via Epitaph Records.

Critical reception
Pitchfork wrote that "the music just isn't strong enough to warrant or excuse the band's bothersome attitudes." The Columbus Dispatch called the album "17 furious songs played ... in fewer than 20 minutes ... The quartet is equally adept at pummeling the ears with slow and midtempo tunes." The Albuquerque Journal thought that "quick songs blow by like fists from a hated bully, while others chug along a la Black Sabbath."

Track listing
"God of GSXR"
"Telepath Boy"
"Rodney"
"Twisted"
"Dogfight"
"Kicked in the Teeth"
"Fuck All Night"
"Revolution"
"Killer Inside"
"Lawson"
"Revolution Reprise"
"Goggle Boy"
"Zeke You"
"Porked"
"Aces High"
"Shout It Out Loud" (Kiss cover)
"Mert"

References

1998 albums
Zeke (band) albums
Albums produced by Jack Endino